More Gold – 20 Super Hits Vol. II is a 1993 greatest hits album by Boney M. Producer Frank Farian issued More Gold - 20 Super Hits Vol. II containing the remainder of Boney M.'s best known songs – again most of them appearing in remixed or overdubbed form but credited as the original versions – as well as four new recordings featuring lead singer Liz Mitchell. Two singles were released from the album in Europe, "Ma Baker Remix '93" and "Papa Chico", the latter credited as "Boney M. featuring Liz Mitchell" and released in early 1994.

Track listing 
"Love for Sale" (Cole Porter) – 4:15
"Bahama Mama" (Farian, Jay) – 3:16
"I See a Boat on the River" (Farian, Jay, Rulofs) – 4:30
"Children of Paradise" (Farian, Jay, Reyam) – 3:20
"The Calendar Song (January, February, March...)" (Farian) – 3:25
"We Kill the World (Don't Kill the World)" (Farian, Sgarbi) – 4:30
"Jimmy" (Farian, Howell, Daansen) – 2:55
"I Shall Sing" (Van Morrison) – 3:09
"Dreadlock Holiday" (Eric Stewart, Graham Gouldman) – 4:20
"Oceans of Fantasy" (Kawohl, Jay, Zill) – 5:05
"Ribbons of Blue" (Keith Forsey) – 4:02
"Motherless Child" (traditional) – 4:15
"I'm Born Again" (Jay, Rulofs) – 3:30
"My Cherie Amour" (Stevie Wonder, Henry Cosby, Sylvia Moy) – 3:55
"Going Back West" (Jimmy Cliff) – 3:10
"Ma Baker (Remix '93)" (Farian, Jay, Reyam) – 4:00
"Time to Remember" (Farian, Kawohl, Farian, Bischof Fallenstein) (new recording) – 4:00
"Da La De La" (Kerim Saka, Mike Wonder, M. Hanief Correl) (new recording) – 4:00
"Papa Chico" (Tony Esposito) (new recording) – 4:05
"Lady Godiva" (Farian, Bischof) (new recording) – 3:40

Personnel
 Liz Mitchell – lead vocals (1 - 5, 7 - 8, 11 - 13, 17 - 20), backing vocals
 Marcia Barrett – lead vocals (6), backing vocals (except tracks 17-20)
 Frank Farian – lead vocals (9 - 10), backing vocals
 Reggie Tsiboe – lead vocals (14 - 15)
 Marlon B. – vocals on track 18

Production
 Frank Farian – producer, remixer

Charts

References

1993 greatest hits albums
Albums produced by Frank Farian
Boney M. compilation albums